Tijuana Beer (Cerveza Tijuana) also known as TJ Beer, is located in the city of Tijuana, and is one of the handful of Mexican microbrewies. Founded in 2000, the master brewer is a third generation master brewer from the Czech Republic who produces all lagers.

Accolades 
Cerveza Tijuana's beers were given the "thumbs up" by both Michael Jackson and Charlie Papazian, two world-renowned beer critics. Cerveza Tijuana is also mentioned in Papazian's most recent book.

References

External links
TJ Beer  - Official website.
Brew Distributing - First US Distributor
Union Tribune - "Mexican Beer Gets Serious" (November 30, 2005)

Beer in Mexico
Companies based in Tijuana
Culture in Tijuana
Mexican brands